The Bombardier Innovia APM 100 C801A (APM 100) is the second generation of an automated people mover (APM) train built by Bombardier Transportation for the Bukit Panjang LRT line. These trains are mainly for airport connections and light rail in towns and it is operated by Automatic Train Control (ATC), making it fully automatic and driverless. The use of rubber tyres and ceramic tracks are extremely quiet compared to conventional rail.

This additional batch of trains will increase the capacity of the Bukit Panjang LRT line by 50% by 2014. As of 4 September 2015, all train cars are officially on revenue service.

Overview
To prevent overcrowding on the Bukit Panjang LRT line, 13 new trains were purchased, thus increasing the fleet capacity by 50%. The first car was delivered on 15 June 2014 bearing the number 120. It started service on 19 November 2014 and by 4 September 2015, all 13 train cars were on service. However, in March 2019, 2 train cars were sent back to New Jersey, USA for retrofitting works of new signalling equipment. These cars returned to Singapore in April 2021. The remaining 11 train cars will have theirs done locally once the retrofit is completed for the 2 train cars.

Design

Exterior 
The C801A trains are cosmetically similar to the C801 trains in terms of exterior shape, excluding the ends.
 C801A trains have circular, bright white LED headlights compared to the C801 trains, which have rectangular, incandescent headlights.
 Windscreens and windows have a grey tint, unlike the C801 whose windows have a green tint.
 The trains also have a more streamlined design and are also the first batch of trains to bear SMRT's "Pixel" livery.
 The trains feature an orange indicator light which illuminates when the doors are open.
 The trains have automatic windscreen wipers which will activate during wet weather conditions.

Interior 
The C801A trains are very similar to the C801 trains in terms of interior design.
 C801A trains have red (priority seats) and lime green seats. The arrangement of the seats is the same while C801 is fully turquoise in colour.
 Ergonomic seats profile, with two priority seats on each end of the cars (indicated in red).
 Additional handgrips have been installed to encourage people to move towards the centre of the car.
 The trains also feature a newer Train Travel Information System (TTIS) and a chime that plays before every announcements.
 As the carriages are closed-end, the train must be stationary and the doors must be open for passengers to move between carriages during 2-car operations.
 At each end, passengers may be seated and view the scenery when the train is moving.
 Passengers have the ability to sit on either ends of the car, accommodating more seating space.

Train formation 
The configuration of a C801A in revenue service is just the one car. With both the motors and the third rail current collectors, the train cars can be coupled up to 2 cars during service.

The car numbers of the trains range from 120 to 132. Individual cars are assigned a three-digit serial number by the rail operator SMRT Trains. A trainset consists of one motor car, e.g. set 120 is car 120. The first digit is always a 1, while the last two digits identify the car number.
 Bombardier Transportation built sets 120–132.

Additional features 
 Some train cars were installed with CCTVs.

Notes

References 

Bombardier Transportation people movers
Innovia people movers
Bombardier Transportation multiple units
Light Rail Transit (Singapore) rolling stock